Eder may refer to:

People
Eder (surname)
Éder (given name), a Portuguese or Spanish given name
Éder (footballer, born 1986), Brazilian footballer Éder Citadin Martins
Eder (footballer, born 1987), Portuguese footballer from Guinea-Bissau Ederzito António Macedo Lopes

Other uses
Eder, California, a community in the United States
Eder (Fulda), a river in western Germany, tributary to the Fulda
Eder (Eggel), a river in western Germany, tributary to the Eggel
Eder (finance), a social institution of Ethiopia